Prince Albert (Glass Field) Airport  is located  northeast of Prince Albert, Saskatchewan, Canada.

History

RCAF Station Prince Albert
The airport was originally opened near Prince Albert on 22 July 1940 under the British Commonwealth Air Training Plan as No. 6 Elementary Flying Training School, with Relief Landing Fields located near Hagen and Emma Lake. The school closed on 15 November 1944.

From 17 March 1941 to 11 November 1942, the station also hosted No. 6 Air Observer School.

Not much remains of the former No. 6 EFTS. A monument was erected to pay tribute to the 17 airmen and one civilian who died in training accidents at the school.

RCAF Aerodrome Prince Albert c.1942

Three serviceable runways were listed as follows:

Relief landing field – Hagen
A relief landing field for RCAF Station Prince Albert was located approximately 18 miles southeast. The site was located west of the hamlet of Hagen, Saskatchewan. The relief field was a square, turf, all way field measuring 2100' x 2100'.

A review of Google Maps satellite imagery on 7 June 2018 shows no details indicating an airfield at the listed coordinates.

Name
This airport is now named for Floyd Glass, who learned to fly in the late 1930s, then served as a military flying training instructor during the Second World War. Postwar, he was the first general manager of the provincial Crown corporation Saskatchewan Government Airways. He resigned from this post, flew briefly with British Columbia's Queen Charlotte Airways, then returned to Saskatchewan and in 1955 formed his own firm, Athabaska Airways. Glass died in 1999.

Airlines and destinations
Rise Air operates charters for staff working at northern mine sites for Cameco and Orano.

See also 
 Prince Albert (Fire Centre) Heliport
 List of airports in Saskatchewan

References

External links 
 Official website
 Page about this airport on COPA's Places to Fly airport directory

 British Commonwealth Air Training Plan Museum - www.airmuseum.ca
 Bruce Forsyth's Canadian Military History Page

Certified airports in Saskatchewan
Buildings and structures in Prince Albert, Saskatchewan
Transport in Prince Albert, Saskatchewan
Royal Canadian Air Force stations
Military airbases in Saskatchewan
Airports of the British Commonwealth Air Training Plan
Military history of Saskatchewan